Alchornea latifolia  is a species of tree in the family Euphorbiaceae. It is native to Central and South America, as well as the Caribbean, where its common names include aguacatillo, baconá and chote.

Description
The leaves have thick stalks and are ovate to elliptic, with a rounded base and a short pointed apex. The leaf margins have a small number of short, blunt teeth and the lower side of the leaf blade is downy. The individual flowers are stalkless and have two sepals and eight stamens. The female flowering spike sometimes branches and is a similar length.

Distribution and habitat
Alchornea latifolia is native to Central and South America and the West Indies. Its range extends from Southern Mexico to Panama, Cuba and the Windward Islands, and Brazil, Bolivia, Peru, Ecuador, Colombia and Venezuela.

Uses
The tree produces many seeds and is a pioneer species, sprouting readily when gaps in the canopy occur. It is sometimes used for the provision of shade in coffee plantations. The branches are used for firewood and the timber for joinery, furniture, posts, crates, boxes, toys, plywood and chipboard.

References 

Alchorneae
Flora of South America
Taxa named by Olof Swartz